The Lund–Hoel House is a historic house museum in Canby, Minnesota, United States.  The residence and an adjacent carriage house were built in 1891 for John G. Lund (1868–1908), an influential land speculator, banker, and politician.  Lund had the house extensively enlarged and remodeled in 1900.  The property was listed on the National Register of Historic Places as the John G. Lund House in 1978 for having local significance in the themes of architecture and exploration/settlement.  It was nominated for its association with Lund—who was instrumental in the settlement of Yellow Medicine County, established several banks in the region, and served as mayor of Canby—and as a fine example of Queen Anne architecture.

See also
 National Register of Historic Places listings in Yellow Medicine County, Minnesota

References

External links
 

1891 establishments in Minnesota
Historic house museums in Minnesota
Houses completed in 1900
Houses in Yellow Medicine County, Minnesota
Houses on the National Register of Historic Places in Minnesota
Museums in Yellow Medicine County, Minnesota
National Register of Historic Places in Yellow Medicine County, Minnesota
Queen Anne architecture in Minnesota